Dimeroceratoidea, formerly Dimerocerataceae, is one of six superfamilies in the goniatitid suborder Tornoceratina which lived During the Devonian. Five families are included, the Dimeroceratidae being the type family.

Gonitites, to which they belong, are primitive ammonites sensu lato, extinct shelled cephalopods more closely related to living animals like squids and octopodes than to similarly shelled nautiloids such as the modern genus Nautilus.

References
 Taxonomy GONIAT-online 10/28/10
 Paleobiology Database - Dimerocerataceae 10/28/10
 Saunders, Work, and Nikoleava 1999. Evolution of Complexity in Paleozoic Ammonoid Sutures, Science Magazine

 
Tornoceratina
Goniatitida superfamilies
Devonian first appearances
Devonian extinctions